"Come Go With Me" is a song written by C. E. Quick (a.k.a. Clarence Quick), an original member (bass vocalist) of the American doo-wop vocal group the Del-Vikings. The song was originally recorded by The Del-Vikings (leadsinger Norman Wright) in 1956 but not released until July 1957 on the Luniverse LP "Come Go With The Del Vikings".

When Joe Averbach, the owner of Fee Bee Records couldn't handle the demand, he signed with Dot Records in late January 1957; the song became a hit, peaking at No. 4 on the US Billboard Best Sellers. It also reached #2 on the R&B chart.

"Come Go with Me" and another 8 songs were recorded in the basement of Pittsburgh disc jockey Barry Kaye. These recordings were released in 1992 as "1956 Audition Tapes".

The song was later featured in the films American Graffiti (1973), Diner (1982),  Stand by Me (1986), Joe Versus the Volcano (1990), and Set It Up (2018).  It was included in Robert Christgau's "Basic Record Library" of 1950s and 1960s recordings, published in Christgau's Record Guide: Rock Albums of the Seventies (1981). It sold over one million copies and was awarded a gold disc.

Rolling Stone magazine ranked the song No. 449 on its list of the 500 Greatest Songs of All Time.

The Beach Boys version

"Come Go With Me" was later covered by American rock band the Beach Boys and was included on their 1978 album, M.I.U. Album. Although not released as a single at the time, the song was included on a Beach Boys compilation album, Ten Years of Harmony, in 1981. After being released as a single to promote the compilation, it rose to No. 18 on the Billboard Hot 100 chart in January 1982. According to Al Jardine, he requested bandmate Brian Wilson to contribute the horn arrangement; Wilson devised it on the spot at Sunset Sound Recorders while dressed in a bathrobe.

Record World said that the performance "spotlights the group's renowned multi-vocal interaction and harmonies."

Personnel
Partial credits from 2000 liner notes.

The Beach Boys
Brian Wilson - horn arrangement
Mike Love - backing vocals
Al Jardine - lead vocals, electric rhythm guitar, bass guitar
Carl Wilson - backing vocals, electric lead guitar
Dennis Wilson – drums
Additional musicians
Michael Andreas – saxophone, horn arrangements
Charles Lloyd – saxophone
Lance Buller – trumpet
John Foss – trumpet
Rod Novak – saxophone
Charlie McCarthy – saxophone
Bob Williams – saxophone
 Matt Jardine, Michael Sherry – handclaps, finger snaps

Chart history

Other versions
Dion covered a version of the song on his 1962 album, Lovers Who Wander. Released as a single (Laurie 3121), it reached No. 48 on the Billboard Hot 100 in 1963.

The Quarrymen, a precursor to the Beatles, played "Come Go with Me" at the fete at St Peter's Church, Woolton, Liverpool, on July 6, 1957. This was the first time Paul McCartney heard John Lennon performing. McCartney noticed how Lennon did not seem to know all the words, so he was ad-libbing instead, with phrases like "come and go with me... down to the penitentiary" which he thought was clever. After the set, McCartney impressed Lennon with his guitar and piano skills, and Lennon invited McCartney to join the band. In 2000, several ex-Quarrymen performed a version of the song for the film Two of Us.

References

1956 singles
1957 singles
1981 singles
1982 singles
The Del-Vikings songs
Dion DiMucci songs
The Beach Boys songs
The Fleetwoods songs
The Coral songs
Kenny Loggins songs
1956 songs
Dot Records singles
The Quarrymen songs